Danes is a surname. Notable people with the surname include:

Anna Danes (born 1969), American singer-songwriter
Claire Danes (born 1979), American actress
Kerry and Kay Danes (born 1958 and 1967)

Fictional characters
Luke Danes, a main character in the television series Gilmore Girls
Oswald Danes, a character in the television series Torchwood

See also
Dane (name)

Ethnonymic surnames